Interlac is a fictional language used by characters of the United Planets in stories set in the 30th century of the DC Comics universe, especially stories about the Legion of Super-Heroes. Although the characters are said to be conversing in this language, dialog is presented to the reader in English (or whatever local language the comic has been translated to). Interlac text is sometimes depicted visually using the Interlac alphabet as a simple one-to-one substitution cipher for the 26 letters of the English alphabet and 10 numerals.

It is also the name of a similarly-used language in the TV series Babylon 5.

DC Universe
The first reference to Interlac as the "intergalactic universal language of the 30th century" was in Adventure Comics #379 published in March 1969. It was also frequently referred to in the Super Friends comic book series to explain how the Super Friends could understand the language of visiting and/or invading extraterrestrials. The Interlac alphabet was codified years later by writer Paul Levitz and artist Keith Giffen in Legion of Super-Heroes (vol. 2) #312 (June 1984).

Interlac is also shown to be the language in which the Guardians of the Universe write the Book of Oa.

Interlac is also spoken by Lobo in Young Justice: Outsiders.

Babylon 5
In the universe of the TV series Babylon 5, Interlac is a universal language most often used in first contact situations because it is easily translated. It is easily translated because it is a language based on pure mathematics. In this context, it is normally used only in first contact situations until such a time as a more common understanding between two new species becomes available. Unlike the DC Comics "Interlac", the common trade language in the Babylon 5 universe is English.

See also
Legion of Super-Heroes
DC Comics
Babylon 5

References

External links
INTERLAC - Interlac, the Intergalactic Language

Alphabets
Artistic languages
DC Comics
Fictional languages
Legion of Super-Heroes
Babylon 5